The CCB Centre for Sporting Excellence (Welsh: Canolfan Rhagoriaeth Chwaraeon Brwrdeistaf Sirol Caerffili) was opened in May 2014. The CCB Centre for Sporting Excellence in Ystrad Mynach, Caerphilly, Wales, is a sports facility located in and run by Caerphilly County Borough Council, South Wales. The Centre's facilities include a FIFA 2 star 3G Football Pitch, an IRB 22 ratified 3G Rugby Pitch, 2 conference rooms, a strength and conditioning room, medical & first aid rooms, a community room, 2 grandstands; 1 on each pitch and 2 balconies overlooking both pitches for performance analysis purposes.  

Both grandstands have seating for 500 spectators. The office space on the 1st floor hosts the Newport Gwent Dragons coaching & management staff and some regional Welsh Rugby Union staff are also based at the centre.

The Newport Gwent Dragons use the facility as a training base, along with local educational establishment Coleg y Cymoedd.

The Centre was opened with the help and support of the Welsh Rugby Union, Welsh Football Trust, Sport Wales & Welsh Government funding. The principal contractor who built the site was Heron Bros Ltd of Northern Ireland.

Facilities

 FIFA 2 star 3G football pitch with grandstand (500 seats) 
 IRB 3G Rugby pitch with grandstand (500 seats) 
 Strength and conditioning room 
 "Aaron Ramsey" conference suite
 "Ryan Jones" conference suite
 Community meeting room
 Rugby and football changing rooms with officials changing facilities
 Newport Gwent Dragons/Welsh Rugby Union staff offices
 Parking for around 75 cars

Past and present users

 Newport Gwent Dragons
 Newport Gwent Dragons Academy
 Welsh Rugby Union Age Grade Rugby 
 Penallta RFC 
 Cross Keys RFC 
 Senghenydd RFC 
 Caerphilly RFC 
 South Wales Scorpions RLFC 
 Welsh Rugby Union Ladies 
 Coleg Gwent
 Carmarthen Town FC 
 Cardiff City F.C. Academy 
 Welsh Veterans Football 
 Football Association of Wales Learning Disability National Squad; 
 Llanyrafon Ladies FC
 Risca United F.C.
 Risca United Academy 
 Caerphilly Schools Football
 Caerphilly Castle Ladies & Girls FC 
 Cascade F.C.
 Nelson Cavaliers F.C. 
 Treharris FC Under 11s
 Bedwas RFC
 Aberbargoed Buds F.C.
 Urdd Gobaith Cymru
 Coleg Y Cymoedd
 Coed Duon Dragons F.C.
 Blaenau Gwent Women RFC
 Westfields F.C.
 Pontllanfraith RFC
 Senghenydd Ladies RFC
 Newbridge RFC Under 12s
 Ynysddu RFC Mini & Junior teams
 Rhymney Valley Schools Rugby Union
 Soccersixes
Cardiff City Ladies FC

References

http://www.caerphillyobserver.co.uk/news/473955/caerphilly-council-unveils-6m-sports-complex-plan-for-ystrad-mynach/

External links 
 Mynach Centre for Sporting Excellence Progress (Flickr)
 Ystrad Mynach Centre for Sporting Excellence official opening (www.wru.co.uk)
 stars give their seal of approval to new Centre for Excellence (www.caerphilly.gov.uk)
 Caerphilly County Borough Council official website
 Verde Recreo - Our Projects - Ystrad Mynach 3G

Sports venues in Wales